Hastina subfalcaria is a moth in the family Geometridae first described by Hugo Theodor Christoph in 1881. It is found in Japan and Russia.

The wingspan is 14–15 mm.

References

Moths described in 1881
Asthenini
Moths of Japan